The Worimi conservation lands are located on and adjacent to Stockton Beach in New South Wales, Australia. They were created in February 2007 when Crown land at Stockton Bight was granted to the Worimi Local Aboriginal Land Council. Day-to-day management of the Worimi conservation lands is undertaken by the NSW National Parks and Wildlife Service.

Geography 
They consist of the  Worimi National Park,  Worimi State Conservation Area and  Worimi Regional Park.

Stockton Beach 

Approximately  of the length of Stockton Beach is included in the Worimi conservation lands.

History
The creation of the Worimi Conservation Lands occurred in February 2007. Its creation was the result of extensive efforts by the Worimi people to have this area reserved to ensure the protection of their cultural heritage, and recognition of their communities association with the area for thousands of years.

The Worimi Conservation Lands are overseen by a Board comprising a majority of stakeholders from the Worimi Community, plus representatives from the NSW National Parks and Wildlife Service, Port Stephens Local Council, nearby landholders, and a conservationist representative.

The Worimi Conservation Lands will be managed according to a Plan of Management prepared by the NSW National Parks and Wildlife Service. As at early 2012 the Plan of Management is still undergoing drafting.

Tourism
Commercial tourist operators provide access to the Worimi Conservation Lands.

References

External links
  Worimi Conservation Lands website

Port Stephens Council